Ashlie Walker (London, England) is a British Acting Coach & Life Coach. She has been working in television since the age of ten and has had roles in Bad Girls, Casualty, Doctors, Hollyoaks and A Touch of Frost. She has appeared in advertising made for television as well as Independent films & music videos.

Ashlie trained in performing arts at Ravenscourt Theatre School between 1998 and 2000, and then went on to the Urdang Academy, to study Dance, before studying further at the Academy of Science of Acting and Directing from 2003 to 2005, and later The Actors Temple from 2010 to 2013.

Alongside her performance training she studied in Psychology at The Open University (First Class Hons Psychology) & Hypno-CBT at The UK college of Hypnosis & Hypnotherapy.
She has worked as both a television presenter (BBC, Word on the Street) & news reader (Celebro Media / The Voice of Russia)

Ashlie Walker was the managing director of The Actors Temple (London) from 2015 to 2019 alongside being an acting teacher there.

She now works in London & Internationally as an Acting Coach (specialising in Meisner Technique) & Life Coach for women, integrating the benefits of Hypnotherapy & CBT.

Founder of 'The Transformation Process' Coaching Programme, Ashlie works to empower female creatives, mums & entrepreneurs, teaching them the skills & tools to overcome anxiety, self-doubt, self-sabotage & trauma so they can create a life they love. She has a website at AshlieWalker

References

External links
AshlieWalker

Life Coach
English film actresses
English television actresses
Living people
Actresses from London
English child actresses
20th-century English actresses
21st-century English actresses
1984 births